The Washington Afro-American newspaper is the Washington, D.C., edition of The Afro-American Newspaper.

History
The newspaper was founded in 1892 by Civil War veteran Sgt. John H. Murphy, Sr. Murphy merged his church publication, The Sunday School Helper, with two other church publications, The Ledger and The Afro-American, and the publication rose to prominence under the control of his tenth-born child, Carl J. G. Murphy, who served as its editor for 45 years. There have been as many as 13 editions of the newspaper in major cities across the country; today, there are just two: one in Baltimore, the other in Washington, D.C.

Call numbers 

Because of its varied titles over the years, The Washington Afro-American has received numerous different call numbers from the Library of Congress and OCLC:

The Afro-American (1936–1937):

Washington Afro American (1937–1964):

Washington Afro-American (1930s–1964):

Washington Afro-American and The Washington Tribune (1964–1984):

The Afro-American (1988):

Washington Afro-American and Washington Tribune (1984–2015):

See also 
List of African-American newspapers in Washington, D.C.

References

External links
Washington Afro American and the Washington Tribune print edition
The Afro American Newspapers online edition

Newspapers published in Washington, D.C.
African-American newspapers
African-American history of Washington, D.C.
Publications established in 1892
1892 establishments in Washington, D.C.